The House of Sinzendorf (also: Sinzendorff) was a Bavarian-Austrian noble family with Upper Austrian origin (Sinzendorf in Nußbach), not to be confused with the Lower Austrian House of Zinzendorf. The family belonged to prestigious circle of high nobility families, but died out in 1822 in the male line.

History 

The Sinzendorf family appear in the 13th century as Ministerialis of the Kremsmünster Abbey. The ancestral castle was Sinzendorf in the municipality Nußbach in Traunviertel. From 1404 to 1566 they owned Castle Feyregg, from 1497 to 1708 Castle Fridau was owned by the family. Around 1450, the family split into two lines (later referred to as Ernstbrunn-Feyregg and Fridau - Neuburg). In 1592 Joachim von Sinzendorf bought the castle and the reign of Ernstbrunn (with Klement Castle and Michelstetten Castle) and considerably expanded the Ernstbrunn Palace.

In 1610 the nobles of Sinzendorf were raised to the baron, 1653 in the Imperial Count. 1653 bought Rudolf von Sinzendorf from Ernstbrunn the castle county Rheineck am Rhein, thus his line was part of the Kuriatstimme the Westphalian Grafenbank in the Imperial Imperial Council and rose to the imperial high nobility on. In the second half of the 17th century, Georg Ludwig Graf von Sinzendorf bought the county of Neuburg am Inn, which was lost in 1680 again.

1654 Count Georg Ludwig von Sinzendorf from the Fridau-Neuburger line is invested with the hereditary treasury of the Roman-German Emperor; as a sign, he was allowed to record the imperial crown in his coat of arms. In 1677, he also acquired a realm- rich position: As the owner of the rule Thannhausen (Swabia), he became a member of the Swabian Imperial College, until 1708 this rule was sold by his descendants to the Counts of Stadion.

The line Neuburg am Inn is extinct in 1767. The line Ernst Brunn divided into the Majoratslinie and into the younger one. For the former, raised in 1803 in the imperial princely state, included the dominions Ernst Brunn, Klement, Straussberg, Triebel, Castle Eichhorn (from 1707-1802), inter alia, in Austria, Bohemia and Moravia, and the castle county Winterrieden in Bavaria, which the family instead of the lost County Rheineck was given. With Prosper of Sinzendorf on Ernstbrunn (1751-1822), raised to the rank of sovereign imperial prince in 1803, but mediatized to Bavaria in 1806. With the death of Prince Prosper the family died in 1822 in the male line. It was followed by a protracted inheritance dispute that ended in 1828 when Prince Henry LXIV of Reuß-Köstritz took over the rule of Ernstbrunn, whose descendants still have it today.

The younger line also had goods in Austria and Bohemia, Planá (Tachov District), Kočov and so on.

Heirdom 
 Between 1630 and 1662 Johann Joachim Freiherr and Count of Sinzendorff was in pledge possession of the county seat located at the lower Inn Ortenburg, as he bought the ruling Count Friedrich Casimir debt instruments.
 In 1654, the counts of Sinzendorf bought the castle county Rheineck as kurkölnisches fief of the barons of Warsberg. This was compensated at the Reichsdeputationshauptschluss including the village Winterrieden in - later Bavarian - Lower Allgäu, with an elevation of this place to a "castle county".
 1665 the counts of Sinzendorf came into possession of the rule plan in West Bohemia. 
 1654 bought the later Hofkammer president Count George Ludwig von Sinzendorf the county of Neuburg am Inn for 400,000 guilders, which also included the castle Wernstein. The Count had the fortress Neuburg converted into a baroque palace and wanted to expand the county to a significant mercantile center. In 1680, however, Count von Sinzendorf was charged with high treason, lese majeste and other offenses. Then he was relieved of all posts and the county of Neuburg drafted by the Imperial Court Chamber in Vienna.
 1714 bought the Obersthofkanzler count Philipp Ludwig Wenzel of Sinzendorf the Moravian rule Seelowitz of its Mrs. Rosina Katharina Isabella, born Countess of Waldstein-Wartenberg and her sister Maria Anna Franziska of pair for 660,000 Rhenish guldens. He had between 1722 and 1728 by Joseph Emanuel Fischer von Erlach, the baroque palace Seelowitz built; his three sons already sold it in 1743.
 Between 1723 and 1729 Count Prosper Anton Joseph von Sinzendorf had the castle Trpísty built in Bohemia.

Notable members 

Representatives of the noble family included:

 Johann Joachim von Sinzendorf, owner of the imperial county Ortenburg
 Georg Ludwig von Sinzendorf (1616–1681), Austrian politician, owner of the county Neuburg
 Philipp Ludwig Wenzel von Sinzendorf (1671–1742), Austrian diplomat and Court Chancellor (Obersthofkanzler)
 Philipp Ludwig von Sinzendorf (1699–1747), Bishop of Wroclaw and cardinal of the Catholic Church
 Prosper Anton Josef von Sinzendorf (1700–1756), Austrian noble man and courtier, lord of Trpísty, Counsellor and Chamberlain
 Prosper von Sinzendorf (1751–1822), raised to the rank of prince in 1803, Herr auf Ernstbrunn, dies childless
 Anna von Sinzendorf ( –1842), married Countess of Thurn, in second marriage Marchesa Pannochieschi Countess d'Elci, sister of the previous, last Countess of Sinzendorf

See also
Lapčan family
Kurjaković family

Literature 
Constantin von Wurzbach: Sinzendorf, die Grafen und Fürsten, Genealogie. In: Biographisches Lexikon des Kaiserthums Oesterreich. 35. Theil. Kaiserlich-königliche Hof- und Staatsdruckerei, Wien 1877, pg. 13–15.
Constantin von Wurzbach: Sinzendorf, die Grafen und Fürsten, Wappen. In: Biographisches Lexikon des Kaiserthums Oesterreich. 35. Theil. Kaiserlich-königliche Hof- und Staatsdruckerei, Wien 1877, pg. 24.

External links 

 Die Sinzendorfer im Mittelalter
 
 
 Sinzendorf bei Zeno.org

Austrian noble families
Bavarian noble families